"Red Roses for a Blue Lady" is a 1948 popular song by Sid Tepper and Roy C. Bennett (alias Roy Brodsky). It has been recorded by a number of performers. Actor-singer John Laurenz (1909–1958) was the first to record the song for Mercury Records. It rose to #2 on the weekly “Your Hit Parade” radio survey in the spring of 1949. The original 78rpm single was issued on Mercury 5201 - Red Roses For A Blue Lady (Roy Brodsky-Sid Tepper) by John Laurenz.

Lyrical content
The song is about a man who wishes to give flowers as a gift to the woman he loves after the two have had a disagreement and that said disagreement made her blue (i.e., sad). He hopes that if his sweetheart  accepts his plea for forgiveness, the two will marry and that he will soon return to pick out the florist’s “best white orchid for her wedding gown."

Other recorded versions 
The best-selling recording was made by Vaughn Monroe and his orchestra, with credited vocalists Vaughn Monroe and The Moon Men, on December 15, 1948. It was released by RCA Victor Records as catalog number 20-3319 (in United States) and by EMI on the His Master's Voice label as catalogue numbers BD 1247, HN 3014, HQ 3071, IM 13425, and GY 478. It first reached the Billboard magazine chart on January 14, 1949 and lasted 19 weeks on the chart, peaking at #4.
Another recording was made by Guy Lombardo and his Royal Canadians on December 22, 1948. It was released by Decca Records as catalog number 24549. The record first reached the Billboard chart on February 4, 1949 and lasted 13 weeks on the chart, peaking at #10.
The song was revived during the winter of 1965 by vocalists Vic Dana and Wayne Newton and instrumentalist Bert Kaempfert, all three versions charting simultaneously: Dana's rendition was the most successful, peaking at #10 on the Billboard Hot 100 chart. Kaempfert's recording peaked at #11 on the same chart, and Newton's reached #23. All three versions were also listed on Billboard′s Easy Listening survey, reaching #2, #3, and #4 respectively.  
Andy Williams released a version in 1965 as the B-side to his hit song "...and Roses and Roses".  *Harry James recorded a version in 1965 on his album Harry James Plays Green Onions & Other Great Hits (Dot DLP 3634 and DLP 25634).
Bruno Balz has written German lyrics. The German title is "Ich sende dir Rosen". The Cornel Trio recorded it in Berlin on October 15, 1952. The song was released by Electrola as catalog number EG 7848.
The Swedish singer Östen Warnerbring had his breakthrough in 1965 with a Swedish version of the song with lyrics by Carl Holmberg, "En röd blomma till en blond flicka".

Chart history

Weekly charts
Vaughn Monroe and His Orchestra Vocalists

Guy Lombardo and his Royal Canadians

Vic Dana

Year-end charts

Bert Kaempfert & His Orchestra

Wayne Newton

References

1948 songs
1949 singles
1965 singles
Songs written by Sid Tepper
Songs written by Roy C. Bennett
Vic Dana songs
Andy Williams songs
Vaughn Monroe songs
Wayne Newton songs